Apocleora is a genus of moths in the family Geometridae.

Species
Apocleora rimosa Butler, 1879

Ennominae
Geometridae genera